Burdge is a surname. Notable people with the surname include:

Julia R. Burdge, American chemistry professor and author
Lindsay Burdge (born 1984), American actress and producer
Richard Burdge (1833–1916), American politician

See also
Burge

English-language surnames